Jane Campbell may refer to:
 Jane Campbell, Baroness Campbell of Surbiton (born 1959), Commissioner of the Equality and Human Rights Commission
 Jane L. Campbell (born 1953), American politician
 Jane Campbell (table tennis) (born 1968), British Paralympic table tennis player
 Jane Campbell (soccer) (born 1995), American soccer goalkeeper
 Jane Cannon Campbell, American Revolutionary War patriot
 Jane Montgomery Campbell, British musician and poet
 Jane Maud Campbell, librarian

See also
 Lady Jeanne Campbell (1928–2007), British socialite
 Janey Sevilla Callander (married name Campbell, 1846–1923), British theatre producer and society hostess